The Wenchang dialect is a dialect of Hainanese spoken in Wenchang, a county-level city in the northeast of Hainan, an island province in southern China.

It is considered the prestige form of Hainanese, and is used by the provincial broadcasting media.

Phonology
The initials of the Wenchang dialect are as follows:

and may be treated as allophones of the same phoneme.
The voiced stops  and  occur with only about ten words each.

The high vowels  and  may also occur as medials.

The possible finals are:

The Wenchang dialect has six tones on isolated syllabes:

References

Sources 
 
 

Hainan Min